Louis Mark Laing (born 6 March 1993) is a former English footballer who played as a defender. He started his career at Sunderland and also played for Wycombe Wanderers, Nottingham Forest, Notts County, Motherwell, Inverness Caledonian Thistle, Hartlepool United, Blyth Spartans and Darlington.

Club career

Sunderland
Laing was born in Newcastle upon Tyne, and grew up supporting Newcastle United. Laing started at youth level with Montague B.C. before he joined Newcastle's arch-rivals Sunderland in summer 2009. In his first year at the Sunderland academy, he made 18 appearances, scoring once, despite injuries during the 2009–10 season.

Laing made his Sunderland debut on 14 May 2011, coming on as a late substitute for John Mensah in a 3–1 defeat at home to Wolverhampton Wanderers. Although manager Steve Bruce was normally keen to let young players out on loan to play first-team football, the Sunderland Echo speculated that Laing might "have a part to play" for his parent club.

On 16 January 2012, Laing signed for League One club Wycombe Wanderers on a one-month loan. On 21 January, he made his debut in a 3–0 win against Rochdale at Adams Park. The loan was extended until the end of the season.

On his return from loan, Laing signed a new contract with Sunderland. His next two seasons were overshadowed by injuries, and he was released at the end of the 2013–14 season.

Nottingham Forest
Despite interest from Blackburn Rovers, Newcastle United and Manchester United, Laing signed a one-year deal with Nottingham Forest.

Having only featured in Forest's reserves and under-21 sides, Laing joined Notts County on a one-month emergency loan on 12 September 2014. He made his County debut the next day in a 0–0 draw with Peterborough United. After helping the club keep four clean sheets in seven matches, Laing's loan spell with Notts County was extended to the maximum 93 days. After making ten appearances for the club, Laing's loan spell with Notts County came to an end, as he made his last appearance against Swindon Town on 13 December.

On 30 January 2015, Laing moved on loan to Motherwell until the end of the 2014–15 season. He made his debut the following day against St Johnstone, but was sent off after 25 minutes. Laing scored his first Motherwell goal in a 2–1 win over Inverness CT on 28 February. He played in both legs of the Scottish Premiership play-off final as Motherwell maintained their top-flight status with a 6–1 win on aggregate against Rangers. At the end of the season, Laing returned to his parent club, although he said he hoped he would be able to come back to Motherwell.

Laing was released by Nottingham Forest at the end of the season, having never made an appearance for the club.

Motherwell
On 30 June 2015, Laing returned to Motherwell, signing a two-year contract with the club. In March 2016, Laing revealed that earlier in the season, while out of the first team at Motherwell, he had considered giving up football.

On 15 August 2016, Laing moved on loan to Notts County until 16 January 2017. He was released by Motherwell on 31 January.

Inverness
Laing signed for Inverness Caledonian Thistle on 16 February 2017 on a contract due to run until the end of the 2016–17 season.

Hartlepool United
Laing signed for Hartlepool United on 10 July 2017. His contract was terminated by mutual consent in October 2018; he made 40 league appearances for the club.

Blyth Spartans
Shortly after his release from Hartlepool, Laing signed for National League North club Blyth Spartans on 18 October.

Darlington
Laing signed for another National League North club, Darlington, in 2019.

International career
Laing played for England at all levels from under-16 to under-19.

Personal life
Laing now works for an insurance broker in Newcastle.

Career statistics

References

External links

1993 births
Living people
English footballers
England youth international footballers
Association football defenders
Sunderland A.F.C. players
Wycombe Wanderers F.C. players
Nottingham Forest F.C. players
Notts County F.C. players
Motherwell F.C. players
Inverness Caledonian Thistle F.C. players
Hartlepool United F.C. players
Blyth Spartans A.F.C. players
Darlington F.C. players
Premier League players
English Football League players
Scottish Professional Football League players
National League (English football) players